Wilson Arch, also known as Wilson's Arch, is a natural sandstone arch in , southeastern Utah, United States just off U.S. Route 191 located in San Juan County,  south of Moab. It is visible from the road to the east where there are turnouts with interpretive signs.

According to the sign at the pulloff near the arch: 

Wilson Arch was named after Joe Wilson, a local pioneer who had a cabin nearby in Dry Valley.  This formation is known as Entrada Sandstone. Over time superficial cracks, joints, and folds of these layers were saturated with water. Ice formed in the fissures, melted under extreme desert heat, and winds cleaned out the loose particles. A series of free-standing fins remained. Wind and water attacked these fins until, in some, cementing material gave way and chunks of rock tumbled out.  Many damaged fins collapsed like the one to the right of Wilson Arch. Others, with the right degree of hardness survived despite their missing middles like Wilson Arch.

References

External links

Natural arches of Utah
Natural arches of San Juan County, Utah
Tourist attractions in San Juan County, Utah